Inward Bound (IB) is an endurance and orienteering running competition held between the residential halls and colleges of the Australian National University with participation from the Australian Defence Force Academy.  It is a unique event combining aspects of both orienteering and rogaining while challenging personal endurance. IB is the most prestigious sporting event in the interhall sporting calendar.  Held annually, the competition involves over 250 runners from eleven of the ANU's residences.

The competition is split into seven divisions which are dropped off, blindfolded, at an unknown location in the bush.  The teams of four people then locate their position and race to the endpoint, picking the quickest route through the countryside. Distances from the endpoint vary from up to 100 km for the top divisions to 30 km for the lower divisions.

The event aims to bring these residences closer together, building on the university community at the ANU and creating a sense of camaraderie between residences and those who take part.

Event Outline and Rules
Each participating residence enters seven teams (one into each divisions) into the event. Division 1 is to be dropped off up to 70 km (as the crow flies) from the end point.  The distances reduce with each division down to division 7 which is  dropped of as little as 10–15 km (as the crow flies) from the endpoint. In actual distance run, Division 1 can cover over 100 km and division 7 over 30. The drop-off zones and endpoint are in remote and often secluded environments including fire trails, national parks and state forests.

Before departing for the drop off point, the teams are scrutineered to ensure that they have a set of compulsory equipment.  The compulsory equipment includes:
water
food
maps and compasses
survival equipment

The teams are then blindfolded before boarding buses and departing for the drop off point. The route to drop-off point is deliberately obfuscated, with buses spending upwards of one hour driving around Canberra in order to cause disorientation. This prevents teams from knowing the drop off location right from the start.

The buses leave (beginning with division 1 in the early evening) at 1 hour intervals starting of the eve of the event. Typically division 7 will leave early in the morning of the day of the event.

When the runners are dropped off they remove their blindfolds and each team proceeds to identify their location.  Typically two runners from each team will run in opposite directions to find some indication of their location.  When they return the team confirms its location and plot a course to the end point.  The teams then race to the endpoint.

The rules are structured to ensure that teams rely not only on their fitness, but also on their navigational ability to reach the endpoint.  Thus maps and compasses are the only acceptable navigational aids.  Tools such as GPS and altimeters are forbidden.  Outside assistance in the form of transportation by vehicle or asking other people for the team's location are forbidden.  Checking the addresses on envelopes in mailboxes is also forbidden, as a breach of privacy.

Generally, if a team is caught breaking any of the rules, or if they lose compulsory equipment they will be disqualified. Loss of equipment can also result in time penalties.

Each team receives a number of points for finishing the event.  The number of points for each finishing position increases for each division.  The residence with the most points at the end of the competition wins the event.

Safety Standards
As of 2009, Inward Bound introduced new compulsory safety standards for all teams during the race. Each team was required to carry an EPIRB Distress radiobeacon, a satellite phone and a 3G mobile telephone (in a sealed envelope). Organisers now use a comprehensive radio network across the region, 4WD recovery vehicles and first aiders to ensure competitor safety. Since 2012 the race has been viewable through the internet live GPS tracking system.

History
Inward Bound was first held in 1962.  Mike Gore, the founder of Questacon, is credited with coming up with the idea in memory of close friend and passionate navigationist, Jason Ryan. Ryan is considered to be the 'first' to have embarked on an unmonitored journey through the surrounding Canberra bushland, after setting off in the early hours of the morning on Friday the 17th of August, 1962. After running from what is now known as 'civic' in Canberra, Ryan eventually returned two days later, on the Sunday. The exact reason for the trip has been placed under immense scrutiny, with some reporting that Ryan could hear noises when he was sitting in silence, and thought a run such as this could straighten them out. Others believe it was simply a challenge Gore had set Ryan, for which he completed. Furthermore, Bill Packard and John Foster also helped to start the event, in developing the event from the idea and into its infancy.

At the time, the Australian National University had only recently been formed and had only 200 students.  The first event consisted of a race from South of Canberra to Bruce Hall.  At the time Bruce Hall was the only residence on campus and the student population numbered approximately 200.  The initial race was won by a team which hitch-hiked back to Bruce Hall.

Teams cannot use outside assistance to reach the endpoint.  While the format of the race has changed over time due to safety and insurance requirements, the core challenge remains the same.

RMC Duntroon participated in one Inward Bound event in 1965.  The participation was an attempt to develop closer ties between the ANU and RMC following animosity between the two institutions. ADFA participated in 2014 as trial year and have been invited back every year. Sadly they were not told about the continued invitation until 2021 and were meant to compete again. But sadly due to politics around ANU and the ADF, they decided to pull out so as to not further the animosity between the universities.

In 2008, Inward Bound was cancelled because the Organisers were unable to get Stakeholders to 'sign off' before the event was scheduled. In 2009, a comprehensive risk management plan was created for the event. This plan, along with a new dialogue of consultation with ANU administration, state and federal authorities, local councils and landholders meant the event returned in 2009 and has since successfully continued.

Division 7 (Independent), the eighth division, was discontinued from 2013 due to the increased number of teams from the inclusion of more halls and colleges, making the division a financial strain on the event.

In 2020 and 2021, Inward Bound was cancelled as a result of the COVID-19 Pandemic.

Currently the following residences participate in Inward Bound:
Bruce Hall
Burgmann College
Burton & Garran Hall
Fenner Hall
Griffin Hall
John XXIII College
Ursula Hall.
UniLodge
Wamburun Hall
Wright Hall
Gowrie Hall

While not always, recent years have seen Burton & Garran Hall, Bruce Hall, and Griffin Hall emerge as the strongest halls, with Burton and Garran Hall most known for their strong navigational abilities, and Griffin Hall for their strong runners, kindness and humour. As founders of the event, Bruce Hall has a long proud history while Ursula Hall, despite their size disadvantage, consistently perform well - save for in 2019.

Results

Notes

External links
  IB Guide - accessible on the ANU Network
 Inward Bound Official Website

Australian National University